Ndoki may refer to:

 Nouabalé-Ndoki National Park
 Dzanga-Ndoki National Park
 "Ndoki" (song), by Fally Ipupa